Plumeria alba is a species of flowering plant in the genus Plumeria.

Common names
Caterpillar tree
Cagoda tree
Pigeon wood
Nosegay tree
White frangipani
Kath golap
Champa
Frangipanier à fleurs blanches (French)
Lee La Wa Dee
Châmpéi sâ (Khmer)
Hoa chăm pa (Vietnamese)
Kamboja (Indonesian)
Dok Champa
Chafa (Marathi)
Sudu araliya (Sinhala)
Champo (Gujarati)
الياسمين الهندي

Uses
P. alba is often cultivated as an ornamental plant. In Cambodia pagodas especially choose this shrub, with the flowers used in ritual offerings to the deities, they are sometimes used to make necklaces which decorate coffins. In addition, the flowers are edible and eaten as fritters, while the heart of the wood is part of a traditional medical preparation taken as a vermifuge or as a laxative.

Gallery

References

External links

National Tropical Botanical Garden Plant Database
The Plants of Saint Lucia: Wild Flowering Plants
Plumeria alba (White Frangipani), University of Florida

alba
Flora of the Caribbean
Flora of Central America
Garden plants of Central America
National symbols of Laos
National symbols of Nicaragua
Plants described in 1753
Taxa named by Carl Linnaeus
Trees of Îles des Saintes
Flora without expected TNC conservation status